The 2006 AFC Champions League Final was a two-legged football tie to determine the 2006 champions of Asian club football. South Korean club Jeonbuk Hyundai Motors defeated Syrian representative Al-Karamah 3–2 on aggregate to take the title. As of 2022, this was the only final of an AFC Champions League involving a Syrian club. The first leg took place on 1 November 2006 at 19:00 local time (UTC+9) at Jeonju World Cup Stadium in Jeonju and the second leg took place on 8 November 2006 at 20:00 local time (UTC+3) at Khaled bin Walid Stadium, Homs.

Format
The rules for the final were exactly the same as for the previous knockout rounds. The tie was contested over two legs with away goals deciding the winner if the two teams were level on goals after the second leg. If the teams could still not be separated at that stage then extra time would have been played with a penalty shootout taking place if the teams were still level after that.

Route to the final

Al-Karamah

1Al-Karamah's score is shown first.

Jeonbuk Hyundai Motors

1Jeonbuk Hyundai Motors's score is shown first.

Final summary

|}

First leg

Second leg

See also
 2006 AFC Champions League
 2006 FIFA Club World Cup

References

External links
 AFC Champions League Final

Final
AFC Champions League finals
AFC Champions League Final
AFC
AFC
International club association football competitions hosted by South Korea
women's